The Aqqanburlyq (Aqqanbūrlyq) is a river of the North Kazakhstan Region, Kazakhstan. It is a right tributary of the Ishim.

Rivers of Kazakhstan